Navarretia capillaris (formerly Gilia capillaris) is a species of flowering plant in the phlox family known by the common name miniature gilia. It is native to the western United States where it grows in wet, gravel-lined habitat especially in mountains, such as snowmelt runs.

It produces glandular stems coated thinly in hairs and lined with small lance-shaped or linear leaves only one or two millimeters wide. The tiny stem is topped with an inflorescence of one or more flowers each roughly a centimeter long. The calyx is an elongated pocket of fused sepals with lobes separating at the top. The fuzzy, glandular corolla is white to light blue with a yellowish throat.

External links
Jepson Manual Treatment
Photo gallery

capillaris
Alpine flora
Flora of the Western United States
Flora of California
Flora of the Sierra Nevada (United States)
Flora of the Rocky Mountains
Flora without expected TNC conservation status